Renatus is the fourth studio album by Swedish rock band Dynazty. The album shows a totally radical change in the sound of the band, where they leave the hard rock and embodied in a sound heavy metal with rapid and severe riffs, and flirtations with the power metal. The name means "rebirth" in Latin and describes a new phase of the band. It is also a remarkable change in their line up member, bassist Joel Fox Apelgren was replaced by Jonathan Olsson and a recent change of label, StormVox Records for the Spinefarm Records.

Track list
All songs were written by Dynazty.

Cross The Line
Starlight
Dawn Of Your Creation
The Northern End
Incarnation
Run Amok
Unholy Deterrent
Sunrise In Hell
Salvation
A Divine Comedy

Personnel

Nils Molin – lead vocals
Rob Love Magnusson – lead guitar
George Egg - drums
Mikael Lavér – lead guitar
Jonathan Olsson - bass

References

2014 albums
Dynazty albums